Kedon Slovis (born April 11, 2001) is an American football quarterback for the BYU Cougars. Slovis attended and played high school football at Desert Mountain High School in Scottsdale, Arizona. For college, he played his first three years at USC and his fourth at Pittsburgh. For 2023 he will play at BYU as a graduate transfer.

Early years and high school career
Slovis attended Desert Mountain High School in Scottsdale, Arizona. During his two years playing varsity high school football, he passed for 5,549 yards with 50 touchdowns and only 11 interceptions. His high school quarterback coach was Pro Football Hall of Famer Kurt Warner. In his senior year of high school, he received offers from 12 colleges, with Northern Arizona University being the only in-state university, before committing to USC in 2018. USC had been one of the only teams from one of the Power Five conferences to show interest in Slovis, which happened shortly after USC quarterbacks coach Bryan Ellis visited the high school. Arizona State offensive coordinator Rob Likens had also shown interest in Slovis, but was unable to recruit him before he committed to the Trojans. Slovis graduated from his high school a semester early and enrolled at the University of Southern California in January 2019.

College career

USC

2019

Slovis entered the 2019 season as the second quarterback in the depth chart, behind then-starting quarterback JT Daniels. Slovis made his first collegiate appearance in the Trojans' season opener against Fresno State, after Daniels suffered a season-ending knee injury. Slovis would go on to make his first start next week, where he set the school record for quarterback touchdowns in a 45–20 victory over the 23rd ranked Stanford Cardinal. For his efforts, Slovis was named the PAC-12 Freshman of the Week. The next week, Slovis started in an away game against BYU, where he would throw three interceptions in a 30–27 loss in overtime. Slovis would next start in a home game against the 10th ranked Utah Utes, where he left the game early in the first quarter after suffering a possible head injury. Backup quarterback Matt Fink would proceed to lead the Trojans to a 30–23 upset victory. Following the incident, Slovis was placed in the concussion protocol and ruled out for the next game, an away game at Washington, leaving Fink to start. Slovis would return to the starting position for the next game, a narrow loss at 9th ranked Notre Dame. Rebounding from that loss, Slovis would lead the Trojans to two straight wins, a blowout against Arizona and a come from behind victory in USC's first away game win of the season at Colorado. For his performance in the Colorado victory, Slovis was awarded his second PAC-12 Freshman of the Week Award. Following a 56–24 blowout loss to Oregon, where Slovis set the USC record for most pass attempts in a game, Slovis would return to his native Arizona where he set another school record with 292 passing yards and 4 touchdowns in the first quarter of a 31–26 victory against Arizona State. For his performance, Slovis was awarded the PAC-12 Player of the Week Award, while freshman Kenan Christon was named the PAC-12 Freshman of the Week. The following week, Slovis led the Trojans to a 41–17 blowout of Cal going 29/35 for 406 yards, 4 touchdowns and zero interceptions. In the final game of the regular season, Slovis broke another USC record throwing for single game passing yards, throwing for 515 yards and 4 touchdowns (the previous record of 493 yards was set by Matt Barkley in 2012) in a 52–35 win over UCLA. It was his fourth game of at least 400 yards passing, setting yet another school record. During the 2019 Holiday Bowl, with USC down 28–24 and with Iowa's sack leader A.J. Epenesa continuing to beat USC's offensive line, Slovis suffered an elbow strain in the second quarter after getting sacked by A. J. Epenesa. He was replaced by Matt Fink and USC would lose to the Iowa Hawkeyes 49–24.

Slovis finished the 2019 season with a freshman record 3,502 yards, 30 touchdowns to only 9 interceptions and an NCAA Freshman record 71.8 completion percentage, while leading USC to an 8–4 regular season record and a Holiday Bowl berth en route to being named the PAC-12 Freshman of the Year.

2020
Following the 2019 season, multiple sources pegged Slovis as a possible contender for the Heisman Trophy in 2020. On July 14, 2020, he was named to the Davey O'Brien Award Watch List alongside other notable quarterbacks, including 2020 Heisman Trophy favorites Trevor Lawrence and Justin Fields. In light of the COVID-19 pandemic, the 2020 Pac-12 Conference football season was indefinitely suspended. In September, Slovis sent an open letter alongside several other USC players convincing California Governor Gavin Newsom to loosen restrictions related to the pandemic to possibly allow for a 2020 season.

In week one of the 2020 season, against the Arizona State University Sun Devils, Slovis set a USC record of 40 completions as he threw for 380 yards and 2 touchdowns in a 28–27 comeback victory. For his efforts he received Davey O’Brien Award Great 8, Manning Award Star of the Week and CollegeSportsMadness.com Pac-12 Offensive Player of the Week honors. The following week, the Trojans traveled to Tucson to play the University of Arizona Wildcats where Slovis led another 4th quarter comeback, throwing for 325 yards and 1 touchdown in the 34–30 victory. In Week 3, Slovis threw for 264 yards, 2 touchdowns and 1 interception en route to defeating the Utah Utes in Salt Lake City, for the first time since 2012, and improving USC's record to 3–0. Following the cancellation of their Week 4 matchup vs the Colorado Buffaloes due to COVID-19, Slovis led USC to a 38–13 victory over Wazzu throwing for 287 yards and 5 touchdowns (4 of which were to Amon-Ra St. Brown).

In the final week of the regular season, Slovis helped rally the Trojans from an 18-point deficit by throwing for 344 yards and 5 touchdowns (including the game winner to Amon-Ra St. Brown with under a minute left) in a 43–38 victory over against crosstown rival UCLA. For his efforts in the Battle for the Victory Bell, he was named Pac-12 Offensive Player of the Week and CollegeSportsMadness.com Pac-12 Offensive Player of the Week. USC finished the regular season at 5–0 (for the first time since 2006), claimed the PAC-12 South Title and advanced to the PAC-12 Championship Game. For his performance, he was named the PAC-12 Offensive Player of the Week.

In the 2020 Pac-12 Football Championship Game, USC suffered its only loss of the season to the defending Pac-12 Champion Oregon Ducks, 31–24. In a game marred by USC penalties, inconsistencies, turnovers and lack of running game, Slovis went 28-52 for 320 yards with two touchdowns and three interceptions (with his third being picked off in the 4th quarter as he attempted to throw the ball out of bounds). On the final play of the game, Slovis would suffer a season ending shoulder injury.

On December 19, USC announced that it would be opting out of their Bowl Game. The team would finish the season as the PAC-12 South Champions with a 5–1 record and ranked #17 in NCAA. Slovis would lead all PAC-12 Starting Quarterbacks in wins (5), passing yards (1,921), passing yards per game (320.2), completions (177), attempts (264), completion percentage (67.0%) and touchdowns (17) but also lead the league in interceptions (7) and sacks (15). For his play over the season, Slovis was named to the first team All-Pac-12 Team as voted by Pac-12 coaches, first team All-Pac-12 as voted by the Associated Press and third team All-Pac-12 by Pro Football Focus.

2021
In order to improve his mechanics, during the 2021 offseason Slovis began working with QB mechanics coaches Jordan Palmer and Tom House, who have worked with several NFL quarterbacks. Despite this, Slovis struggled in his junior and final season at USC, finishing with 2,153 passing yards, 11 touchdowns and 8 interceptions with a 132.7 quarterback rating as the Trojans would finish with a 4–8 record in 2021. On December 13, 2021, Slovis entered the NCAA transfer portal.

Pittsburgh
On December 21, 2021, Slovis announced he would transfer to Pittsburgh. On August 24, 2022, Slovis was named the starter for the Panthers week 1 game vs West Virginia. On December 5, 2022, Slovis announced he would again enter the transfer portal as a grad transfer.

BYU
On December 24, 2022, Slovis announced he would transfer to BYU for his last year of eligibility and the school's inaugural season in the Big 12 Conference. During an interview on BYU Sports Nation later that month, Slovis said he would wear jersey #10 as a Cougar.

Statistics

References

External links
 USC Trojans bio

2001 births
BYU Cougars football players
Living people
Players of American football from Scottsdale, Arizona
American football quarterbacks
Pittsburgh Panthers football players
USC Trojans football players